Scopula idnothogramma is a moth of the family Geometridae. It is found on Sulawesi.

References

Moths described in 1938
idnothogramma
Moths of Indonesia